Ruben Brynolf Carlsson (29 January 1913 – 14 February 2004) was a Swedish ice hockey player. He competed in the men's tournament at the 1936 Winter Olympics.

References

External links
 

1913 births
2004 deaths
Ice hockey players at the 1936 Winter Olympics
Olympic ice hockey players of Sweden
Ice hockey people from Stockholm